Eduard Prokosch (15 May 1876 – 11 August 1938) was an Austrian historical linguist who specialized in Indo-European and, specifically, Proto-Germanic studies. He was the father of Gertrude Prokosch Kurath, Frederic Prokosch and Walther Prokosch.

Prokosch was born in Eger, Bohemia (modern Cheb, Czech Republic) and studied law in Vienna, passing the bar examination before immigrating to the United States in 1898.

Prokosch taught German and Germanic philology at many American educational institutions, including the University of Chicago, the University of Texas, the University of Wisconsin–Madison, Bryn Mawr College and New York University.

Prokosch finished his career as the Sterling Professor of Germanic Languages at Yale University, during which time he wrote his most influential work, A Comparative Germanic Grammar, which broke ground in the fields of Indo-European and Germanic studies. He died in an automobile accident in New Haven, Connecticut shortly before the book was published in 1939.

Notes

References
Prokosch, Eduard. A comparative Germanic grammar. (Philadelphia: The Linguistic Society of America, University of Pennsylvania Press, 1939).
JSTOR: Language: Vol. 14, No. 4 (Oct. - Dec. 1938, pp. 310-313). Licensed by the Linguistic Society of America.

Linguists from Austria
Historical linguists
1876 births
1938 deaths
Linguists of Germanic languages
Linguists of Indo-European languages
Yale University faculty
Yale Sterling Professors
Yale University Department of German Faculty
 Professors of German in the United States
Linguistic Society of America presidents
Presidents of the Modern Language Association